Thief Valley Reservoir is a large reservoir on the Powder River in Eastern Oregon, United States. Primarily used for irrigation purposes, it lies at an elevation of approximately 3,000 feet, covers an area of 740 acres, and impounds 17,600 acre-feet.  It provides good angling opportunities for rainbow trout in years of high water.

The reservoir was created in 1932 by the Thief Valley Dam, a project of the United States Bureau of Reclamation.  The dam is a concrete-slab-and-buttress Ambursen structure, 73 feet high and 390 feet long. The dam was designed by Frank A. Banks.

See also
 List of lakes in Oregon

References 

Reservoirs in Oregon
Lakes of Baker County, Oregon
Lakes of Union County, Oregon
Buildings and structures in Baker County, Oregon
Buildings and structures in Union County, Oregon
Protected areas of Baker County, Oregon
Protected areas of Union County, Oregon
1932 establishments in Oregon